INS Vagir (S25) is the fifth submarine of the first batch of six s for the Indian Navy.

History and construction

The ship was launched on 12 November 2020.

The submarine inherits its name from INS Vagir (S41) which served in the Navy from 1973–2001, and was named after a species of sandfish.

Vagir, the fifth submarine in the  -class, started its maiden sea trials on 2 February, 2022. The ship was commissioned on 23rd January 2023.

Gallery

See also
List of submarines of the Indian Navy
List of active Indian Navy ships

References

Attack submarines
2020 ships
Ships built in India
Kalvari-class submarines
Submarines of the Indian Navy